Lestes elatus is a species of damselfly in the family Lestidae, the spreadwings. It is known commonly as the emerald spreadwing. It is native to India, Thailand and Sri Lanka.

Description and habitat
It is a medium sized damselfly with greenish blue eyes. Thorax is brown on dorsum, changing to yellowish-brown on the sides. The dorsum of thorax is marked with a pair of narrow ante-humeral metallic green stripes expanded outwardly at the abdominal end like a hockey stick. There are three tiny black spots on the lateral sides. The brown color of the thorax will change to bluish-white due to pruinescence in adults. Its abdomen is pale yellowish brown at the sides in the young,
marked broadly on dorsum with metallic green, up to segment 8. The basal half of segment 9 is black and the apical half is yellowish brown. Segment 10 is yellowish brown. The yellowish-brown color of the abdomen will change to bluish-white due to pruinescence in the adults. Anal appendages are creamy yellow, broadly tipped with black in the young; entirely black in the adults. It can be easily distinguished from other species of this genus by its unique metallic thoracic stripes.

Female is similar to the male and with less pruinescence.    

 
It breeds in ponds, marshes and paddy fields in the plains.

See also 
 List of odonates of India
 List of odonates of Sri Lanka
 List of odonata of Kerala

References

External links

E
Odonata of Asia
Insects of Southeast Asia
Damselflies of Sri Lanka
Insects of India
Insects of Myanmar
Insects of Thailand
Least concern biota of Asia
Insects described in 1862